"Holy Ground" is a song written and recorded by American singer-songwriter Taylor Swift, taken from her fourth studio album, Red (2012). Produced by Jeff Bhasker, "Holy Ground" is an upbeat song combining country rock and heartland rock with insistent drums. In the lyrics, the narrator reminisces about a good moment in a failed relationship; she describes where she and the ex-lover once stood as "holy ground".

Music critics praised the lyrical maturity for showcasing a more complicated understanding of failed relationships, departing from the bitter sentiments on Swift's previous songs. Some picked it as an album highlight and one of Swift's best songs in her discography. "Holy Ground" peaked at number 12 on the Bubbling Under Hot 100 Singles chart and number 89 on the Canadian Hot 100.

A re-recorded version, "Holy Ground (Taylor's Version)", was released as part of Swift's re-recorded album Red (Taylor's Version) on November 12, 2021. "Holy Ground (Taylor's Version)" peaked at number 76 on the US Billboard Hot 100.

Production
Swift released her third studio album, Speak Now, in October 2010. She wrote the album by herself and co-produced it with Nathan Chapman. Speak Now was similar to Swift's previous album, Fearless (2008), in its country pop production style.

On her fourth studio album, Red (2012), Swift wanted to experiment with other musical styles. To this end, she approached different producers beyond her career base in Nashville, Tennessee. One such producer was Jeff Bhasker, whose drum work on the songs by pop-rock band Fun inspired Swift; she finished writing "Holy Ground" before meeting with Bhasker in his studio. There, Swift played the whole song on acoustic guitar, which left Bhasker impressed: "I was just blown away at how stone cold she was[...] Her style of songwriting is very, very honest. She's just a really old soul."

Release and chart performance 
"Holy Ground" is track number 11 on Red, which was released on October 22, 2012, by Big Machine Records. After Red was released, in the U.S., "Holy Ground" peaked at number 12 on the Bubbling Under Hot 100 Singles chart and number 37 on the Hot Country Songs in November 2012. In Canada, it peaked at number 89.

Following a dispute with Big Machine over the rights to the master recordings of Swift's first six studio albums, Swift re-recorded the whole Red album and released it as Red (Taylor's Version) under Republic Records imprint on November 11, 2012; the re-recording of "Holy Ground" is titled "Holy Ground (Taylor's Version)". Bhasker returned on the re-recording as producer. "Holy Ground (Taylor's Version)" debuted and peaked at number 76 on the US Billboard Hot 100, number 62 on the Canadian Hot 100, and number 77 on the Billboard Global 200.

Music and lyrics
Swift wrote "Holy Ground" inspired by an encounter with an ex-lover. Reflecting on the incident, Swift thought, "You know what? That was good... having that in my life." She said that the relationship that inspired the song had ended years ago, which she appreciated rather than feeling bitter about its unpleasant ending. The upbeat track features a recurring guitar riff and constant fast-paced drum beats that, according to Brad Nelson from The Atlantic, are "insistent enough to act as punctuation for the lyrics".

Rob Sheffield from Rolling Stone noted influences of 1980s music by Billy Idol on the guitar. Musicologist James E. Perone characterized "Holy Ground" as country rock, with a "take on the country-pop tradition that had not really been found before in Swift's previous recordings". Meanwhile, Jonathan Keefe from Slant Magazine said that it is a heartland rock track. Other critics said the track features elements of pop rock and country on the drum beats, which Brittany Spanos from Rolling Stone described as "jaunty but gentle". The 2021 re-recording, "Holy Ground (Taylor's Version)", features an identical production, but Swift's vocals do not feature the twang as in the 2012 version.

In the lyrics, the narrator tells a past relationship that ran on "New York time". She reminisces about the early days of a blossoming romance, "Took off faster than a green light, go." There is a fleeting but exhilarating moment which makes the narrator feels that the ground on which the couple used to stand was "holy ground".  According to Perone, the lyrics showcased a new side to Swift's songwriting; whereas her previous songs are mostly bitter confessions accusing ex-lovers of wrongdoings, the narrator in "Holy Ground" tells her ex-lover, "Tonight I'm gonna dance... but I don't wanna dance, if I'm not dancing with you," with a bittersweet and melancholic atmosphere in the wake of a breakup. Nelson agreed that Swift's take on failed relationships became "charmingly complicated".

Randy Lewis from the Los Angeles Times, citing the lyric, "For the first time I had something to lose," said the song explores vulnerability and more nuanced relationship issues for Swift as an adult, transcending the adolescent perspective on her past albums. In PopMatters, Arnold Pan picked "Holy Ground" as an example of Swift's songwriting for crafting specific lyrical details setting her apart from generic lyrics found in other pop artists' music, citing the line "Spinning like a girl in a brand new dress, we had this big wide city all to ourselves" as an example.

Critical reception
In reviews of Red, "Holy Ground" received critical acclaim, with many music critics picking it as an album highlight. According to Perone, "Holy Ground" is a Red track that deserves the attention of casual listeners who are not fans of Swift. Perone praised the lyrical maturity and found the upbeat production, though at odds with the sentimental lyrics, "somehow works" because of the pop hook. Chris Willman of The Hollywood Reporter cited "Holy Ground" as one of the album's finest tracks, and remarked that the "driving drum and rhythm guitar... grab your attention from [the] first verse to [the] last". In Idolators review of Red, Sam Lansky called it the "most startling" track, highlighting the strong lyricism and dynamic production. Jonathan Keefe of Slant Magazine selected "Holy Ground" as one of Red tracks that experiment beyond Swift's country-pop comfort zone, where "the production is creative and contemporary in ways that are in service to Swift's songwriting".

The Spectrum commended the "anthemic", rock-influenced production: "Plenty of bands try it, but it takes a 20-something former country-pop star [Swift] to pull it off." The New Zealand Herald Scott Kara picked it as one of the strongest Red tracks: "These songs prove she's a strong enough songwriter to play it straight, while still being ambitious." Paste, picking it as one of the standouts on Red, described it as "hurried, yet precise, and rocking the hell out". Reviewing Red (Taylor's Version), Olivia Horn from Pitchfork selected it as one of Swift's "great masterpieces" in her career. Spanos included it among the 10 best album cuts from Swift's discography, and Sheffield in 2021 placed it among the 20 best songs out of Swift's 206-song catalog: "Nobody does zero-to-60 emotional peel outs like our girl." Today journalist Francesca Gariano ranked it second on a list of the top 10 songs by Swift of the 2010s decade, behind "All Too Well", another Red track.

On a less positive side, Mesfin Fekadu from the Associated Press deemed it average, and Bernard Perusse from the Edmonton Journal considered it an album filler.

Live performances

Swift included "Holy Ground" in the set list to the concerts on the Red Tour (2013–2014), where she sang the song in front of a New York cityscape background. The song was part of the set list for Swift's concert at the 2016 Formula One Grand Prix in Austin, Texas on October 22. On the Seattle show of her Reputation Stadium Tour on May 22, 2018, Swift performed a stripped-down version of "Holy Ground" as a "surprise song".

In September 2019, during promotion of her seventh studio album Lover, she performed a slowed, stripped-down piano version of "Holy Ground" on BBC Radio 1's Live Lounge held in New York City. Swift said the version was meant to "flip the coin of the song and show another side of it"; Rebecca Alter from Vulture remarked that the Live Lounge rendition contained a "soulful, wise... maturity".

Personnel"Holy Ground"

 Taylor Swift – songwriting, lead vocals
 Jeff Bhasker – programming, producer, bass, keyboards, piano, background vocals
 Pawel Sek – engineering
 Tyler Sam Johnson – engineering, background vocals
 John Hanes – engineering
 Tim Roberts – assistant engineering
 Serban Ghenea – mixing
 Anders Mouridsen – guitar family"Holy Ground (Taylor's Version)"'

 Taylor Swift – lead vocals, background vocals
 Jeff Bhasker – producer, Moog, Juno, background vocals
 Christopher Rowe – vocals engineer
 Ian Gold – drum programming, engineer
 Bryce Bordone – engineer
 Serban Ghenea – mixing
 Mike Meadows – acoustic guitar
 Anders Mouridsen – electric guitar
 Bebel Matsumiya – background vocals

Charts

"Holy Ground"

"Holy Ground (Taylor's Version)"

References

Cited sources

 

2012 songs
Taylor Swift songs
Songs written by Taylor Swift
Song recordings produced by Jeff Bhasker
Heartland rock songs
Country rock songs